Lak people may refer to:

 Laks (Caucasus), an ethnic group of Dagestan, North Caucasus, Russia
 Laks (Iran), an ethnic group of southwestern Iran

See also
 Laks (disambiguation)